Canada has many of its own pizza chains, both national and regional, and many distinctive regional variations and types of pizza resulting from influences of local Canadian cuisine. The "Canadian pizza" toppings typically include tomato sauce, mozzarella cheese, bacon, pepperoni, and mushrooms; although variations exist, this recipe is also known internationally by that name.

Overview
Atlantic Canada has several unique varieties, which have spread to other parts of the country as people migrate for work. Donair pizza is inspired by the Halifax fast food of the same name, and is topped with mozzarella cheese, donair meat, tomatoes, onions, and a sweetened condensed milk-based donair sauce. Garlic fingers is an Atlantic Canadian pizza garnished with melted butter, garlic, cheese, and sometimes bacon, with the round sliced into fingers and served with donair sauce. Pictou County Pizza is a variant of pizza unique to Pictou County in Nova Scotia; this pizza has a "brown sauce" made from vegetables and spices instead of red tomato sauce.

The predominantly francophone Canadian province of Quebec has its specialties. One is the Montreal "all dressed": tomato sauce (a little spicy), pepperoni, onions, green pepper slices, and mushrooms.
The poutine pizza variety is topped with French fries, light gravy, and fresh mozarella curds. The Italian immigrant community in Montreal is known for their Rossa Romana Pizza (sometimes referred to as Pizza Rustica). This is a variety of Italian tomato pie and consists of a thick crust that is covered in a thick plain sweet tomato sauce, and often cut in square pieces and served cold. In Stoney Creek, Ontario, a similar type of cheeseless tomato pie produced by Roma Bakery is popular.

Pizza in the southwestern Ontario city of Windsor is identified by its use of shredded pepperoni and mozzarella cheese from the local Galati Cheese Company. Although fresh mushrooms are the norm for most pizza makers in the city, the style was originally known for using canned mushrooms. The distinct qualities of Windsor-area pizza are believed to have originated with the now-closed Volcano Pizza in Windsor's downtown core. As employees of Volcano eventually left and founded their own pizzerias, they took the recipe with them.

Hawaiian pizza

According to a number of news outlets, the Hawaiian-style (tomato sauce, ham and pineapple) is a Canadian invention, originating at the Satellite Restaurant in Chatham, Ontario. Sam Panopoulos, owner of Satellite, first concocted the Hawaiian pizza in 1962. By that time Satellite had already started serving Canadian Chinese food and Panopoulos thought people would like a similar dish with sweet and savoury flavours together, so he took a can of pineapple and tossed the fruit onto a pizza.

Indian-style pizza
Another variety of the dish in parts of the country is Indian-style pizza (also known as Punjabi-style pizza or Desi-style pizza) which has gradually gained popularity since originating in Greater Vancouver during the mid-1980s. Indian-style pizza has since expanded across urban centres in western and central Canada with large South Asian populations, including Greater Vancouver, Calgary, Edmonton, Regina, Winnipeg, Ottawa, and Greater Toronto, and other regions. This type of pizza typically includes sauce with mixed spices and toppings such as cilantro, ginger, spinach, cauliflower, tandoori chicken, butter chicken, or paneer.

Pizza cake
Pizza cake is a Canadian multiple-layer pizza baked in a pot or cake pan. First invented by Boston Pizza, a Canadian multinational restaurant chain, recipes were posted online as early as April 2014, though they did not become viral until the Pillsbury Company posted an example in September 2014. Reviews have been mixed, with praise aimed at its taste and criticism leveled at its complexity and unhealthiness.

Pizza-ghetti

Pizza-ghetti is a combination meal commonly found in fast food or family restaurants throughout the province of Quebec and other parts of Canada. While a regular pizza slice accompanied with a portion of spaghetti with tomato-based sauce is common, also found is a slightly more elaborate presentation consisting in a miniature pizza, sliced in half with the pasta in the middle. A common variation is the pizza-caesar, where the spaghetti is replaced with caesar salad. Other variants found mostly in Montréal and its suburbs include spaghetti as a pizza topping placed under the mozzarella cheese.

Poutine pizza
Poutine pizza is one variety that can be found sporadically across the country, and adaptations of this item have even been featured in upscale restaurants.

Sushi Pizza

Sushi pizza is a pizza imitation with sushi ingredients. The phenomenon is limited to Toronto. It consists of a fried rice patty topped with a sauce, often sriracha, and vegetables and fish or other seafood. This mimics the style of pizza - bread, sauce and toppings - with completely different ingredients.

See also

 List of Canadian pizza chains
 List of pizza varieties by country
 Canadian cuisine
 History of pizza

References

External links
 

Canada
Canadian cuisine